The 1998 UCI Road World Championships took place in Valkenburg aan de Geul, Netherlands, between 4 and 11 October 1998. The event consisted of a road race and a time trial for men, women, men under 23, junior men and junior women.

Competitors 
A total of 52 nations competed at the 1998 UCI Road World Championships.

  Netherlands (42)

Summary

References
cyclingnews

 
UCI Road World Championships by year
World Championships
Uci Road World Championships
Cycling in Valkenburg aan de Geul
UCI Road World Championships